Onésimo Mariscales Delgadillo (born 16 February 1953) is a Mexican politician from the Institutional Revolutionary Party. From 2009 to 2012 he served as Deputy of the LXI Legislature of the Mexican Congress representing Sonora.

References

1953 births
Living people
People from Sinaloa
Institutional Revolutionary Party politicians
21st-century Mexican politicians
Deputies of the LXI Legislature of Mexico
Members of the Chamber of Deputies (Mexico) for Sonora